Francisco José Rodríguez, Sr. (born January 7, 1982), nicknamed "Frankie" and "K-Rod", is a Venezuelan former professional baseball pitcher. He played in Major League Baseball (MLB) for the Anaheim Angels / Los Angeles Angels of Anaheim, New York Mets, Baltimore Orioles, Milwaukee Brewers and Detroit Tigers.

He served as the closer for both teams. He was then traded to the Detroit Tigers in 2016, and became the Tigers' closer.

In his rookie season, Rodríguez tied Randy Johnson for the record for most victories in a single postseason, recording five wins en route to the Angels winning the World Series; Stephen Strasburg later accomplished this feat as well. Rodríguez holds the major league record for saves in a single season, with 62, set in 2008 while pitching for the Angels. He is a three-time league leader in saves (2005, 2006, and 2008) and a six-time All-Star. Rodríguez is one of only six Major League pitchers to accumulate a total of 400 or more saves in his baseball career.

Professional career

Los Angeles Angels (2002–2008)

2002–2004
Rodríguez signed as an undrafted amateur free agent in 1998. Originally a starting pitcher, Rodríguez moved to relief pitching in 2002 after elbow and shoulder injuries shortened his 2001 minor league season with the Lake Elsinore Storm. In 2002, he made his major league debut. At the time, he was the youngest pitcher in the American League. Because of the multiple injuries to the Angels bullpen, the club brought him up during the middle of September. He emerged as a postseason relief hero, winning five postseason games despite never having won a Major League game before. Although he threw a lively fastball, his sharp-breaking curveball was his most effective pitch, made even better in 2002 by his late season emergence and hitters lack of experience seeing such a huge 12 to 6 late break from a pitch with fastball velocity. The pitch was almost unstoppable in the 2002 postseason.

Because Rodríguez had played very little in the major leagues, hitters in the postseason had very little idea what to expect from him, a situation that often favors the pitcher. The combination of high 90's fastball, the previously unseen high velocity late breaking curve, and the very occasional change up was too much. In the 2002 American League Division Series against the New York Yankees, he got two victories (with 1 win resulting from a blown save). The Angels won the division series against the Yankees in 4 games. During the 2002 American League Championship Series vs the Minnesota Twins, he went 2–0 with seven strikeouts in  innings. The Angels won the series in 5 games. During the 2002 World Series against the San Francisco Giants, he had a 1–1 record with 13 strikeouts in  innings. At 20 years, 286 days old, he became the youngest pitcher ever to win a World Series game. The Angels won the World Series in 7 games due in large part to a rookie set up man that was scheduled for and delivered 3-6 high pressure outs a game.

In 2003, Rodríguez became a setup man. He gave up an earned run in 9 of his first 15 games, but rebounded to only allow 9 in his last 44 appearances. For the 2003 year, Rodriguez made 59 appearances going 8–3 with a 3.03 ERA.

In 2004, Rodríguez was selected for the All-Star Game. On August 24, 2004, he became the sixth pitcher in the Angels' 44-year history to strike out at least 100 batters in a season without starting a game — joining Mark Clear (105 in 1980), DeWayne Buice (109, 1987), Bryan Harvey (101, 1991), Troy Percival (100, 1996), and Scot Shields (109, also in 2004). He finished the 2004 year 4–1 with 123 strikeouts and a 1.82 ERA in 69 relief appearances.

During the 2004 American League Division Series, Francisco Rodriguez had two losses as the Angels lost the division series to the Boston Red Sox in three games.

2005–2007
Entering the 2005 season, veteran Angels closer Troy Percival departed as a free agent which allowed Rodriguez to become the Angels' full-time closer. Rodríguez ended the season 2–5 with a 2.67 ERA in 66 relief appearances and tied the American League lead in saves with 45.

Rodriguez got his first two 2 career postseason saves during the 2005 American League Division Series as the Angels won the division series against the Yankees in 5 games. He got one save in the 2005 American League Championship Series, which the Angels lost to the Chicago White Sox in 5 games.

Rodriguez improved on his share of the 2005 American League saves title by leading the Majors in 2006 with 47 saves, one more than the National League leader Trevor Hoffman and six more than American League runner-up Bobby Jenks. On September 10 against the Toronto Blue Jays, he became the youngest closer in Major League Baseball history, at the age 24 years and 246 days, to accumulate 100 career saves. He accomplished this feat a year younger than the previous record holder, Gregg Olson. Rodriguez held this record until April 10, 2018, when Toronto Blue Jays closer Roberto Osuna acquired his 100th career save. Osuna, at the age of 23 years and 62 days, accomplished the feat about a year and a half younger than Rodriguez.

At the 2007 All-Star Game in San Francisco, Rodriguez was named as one of three Angels to represent the club, along with teammates Vladimir Guerrero and John Lackey. Rodriguez recorded the save as the American League defeated the National League, 5–4. Rodriguez finished the 2007 season 5–2 with a 1.73 ERA and 40 saves in 64 relief appearances.

In the 2007 American League Division Series against the Boston Red Sox, Rodriguez pitched only  of an inning with an ERA accumulating 54.00. In Game 2 Rodriguez gave up a three-run walk-off home run to Manny Ramirez as the Red Sox won the game 6-3.  The Angels eventually lost the division series to the Red Sox in just 3 games.

2008: Single season saves record
Rodríguez received his second career Delivery Man of the Month Award after posting 11 saves in 12 appearances during the month of June. Rodríguez set a major league record by recording his 35th save before the All-Star Break, breaking the previous record of 34 set by John Smoltz in 2003. He was a member of the American League All-Star Team for the third time and made a brief appearance in the game, facing two batters while walking one. On August 20, 2008, he set both his and the Angels single season record with his 48th save. With his 50th save on August 24, 2008, Rodríguez became the first relief pitcher to reach that number since Mariano Rivera in 2004 and the ninth overall. He was also the youngest pitcher to ever reach that number at 26 years, 7 months, and 17 days. In addition, he reached that milestone in 129 team games, faster than any pitcher in history. With three saves during the week of August 18–24, including the milestone of number 50, Rodríguez was awarded the American League Player of the Week for the first time in his career.

On September 2, 2008, Rodríguez saved his 200th career game (54th of the season), becoming the youngest player in history to reach that number. On September 10, 2008, while facing the New York Yankees, Rodríguez saved his 56th game of the season and clinched the American League Western Division title for the Angels. On September 11, 2008, while facing the Seattle Mariners, Rodríguez saved his 57th game of the season, tying Bobby Thigpen's 1990 major league record.

On September 13, 2008, while again facing the Mariners, Rodríguez recorded his 58th save of the season, setting a new MLB record. On September 20, 2008, Rodríguez became the first pitcher to reach 60 saves in a season when he closed out a 7–3 victory against the Texas Rangers.

Rodríguez finished his record-setting 2008 regular season performance with 62 saves in 69 opportunities, appearing in an AL-leading 76 games. It was his fourth consecutive season of recording at least 40 saves. He finished third in AL Cy Young Award voting and sixth in AL Most Valuable Player Award voting.

The Angels again faced the Red Sox in the 2008 American League Division Series. Rodriguez lost a game and the Angels would lose the series to the Red Sox in four games.

New York Mets (2009–2011)

On December 10, 2008, Rodríguez signed a three-year, $37 million contract with the New York Mets. Rodríguez, who had worn number 57 for his entire career, switched to number 75, as Mets ace Johan Santana wore number 57 at the time. On April 6, 2009, Rodríguez recorded his first save as a Met against the Cincinnati Reds.

On May 24, 2009, Rodríguez suffered a back injury and was taken to a local Boston hospital where he was given medication for the pain. He returned to the team the next day.

He was selected to play in the 2009 All-Star game and pitched a scoreless 9th inning.

On September 30, 2009, Rodríguez surrendered a walk-off grand slam to Justin Maxwell to cap a five-run ninth inning that lifted the Washington Nationals to a 7–4 victory over the Mets. This made him the first pitcher to allow two walk-off grand slams in one season since Lee Smith did in 1995 (on August 7, Rodriguez surrendered a grand slam to Everth Cabrera with no outs to cap another five-run ninth inning that gave the San Diego Padres a 6–2 win over the Mets).
Rodríguez finished the 2009 season 3–6 with a 3.71 ERA and 35 saves converted out of 42 opportunities. It was his fifth consecutive season of 30 or more saves.

During his suspension-shortened 2010 season, Rodriguez appeared in 53 games going 4–2 with a 2.20 ERA and 25 saves.

Rodriguez started the 2011 season with 42 relief appearances going 2–2 with a 3.16 ERA and 23 saves.

Milwaukee Brewers (2011–2013)

On July 12, 2011, immediately following the All-Star Game, Rodríguez was traded to the Milwaukee Brewers along with cash, for Adrian Rosario and Danny Herrera. The Associated Press noted the Brewers had two potential closers in Rodríguez and their existing closer, John Axford. Rodríguez expressed his unhappiness in September to being used as the setup man to Axford. Axford finished the season with a streak of 43 consecutive save opportunities converted. In 31 games for the Brewers, Rodríguez was 4–0 with a 1.86 ERA. Overall for the 2011 season, he was 6–2 with a 2.64 ERA in 73 appearances. He had 23 saves, all with the Mets. Through 2011, he was 4th among all active pitchers in career saves (291) and games finished (445), and 8th in fielding percentage (.970).

Rodriguez made two appearances in the 2011 NLDS vs the Arizona Diamondbacks and struck out four. The Brewers won the series against the Diamondbacks in five games. He appeared in three games of the 2011 NLCS vs the St. Louis Cardinals. His ERA during the series was 3.00 and his new team of the Brewers would eventually lose the series to the Cardinals in six games.

In January 2012, Rodríguez signed a one-year, $8 million contract with the Brewers through arbitration. The Brewers again planned to have Rodríguez and Axford in the bullpen, shifting between the two depending on who has been struggling of late. In 2012, Rodriguez made a career high of 78 relief appearances going 2–7 with a 4.38 ERA and only 3 saves.

On October 29, 2012, the Brewers granted Rodriguez free agency. They re-signed him to a minor league deal on April 17, 2013 worth $2 million plus incentives if he made the major league team. After a brief stint at the Brewers' spring training complex, Rodriguez joined the Brewers. He appeared in 25 games, going 1–1 with a 1.09 ERA and 10 saves before being traded in July to the Baltimore Orioles.

Baltimore Orioles (2013)
On July 23, 2013, the Brewers traded Rodríguez to the Baltimore Orioles for minor league prospect Nicky Delmonico. Rodríguez struggled in his Orioles tenure, posting a 4.50 ERA in 23 appearances with the team. Overall in 2013, combined with both teams, he made 48 total relief appearances with a 3-2 record, a 2.70 ERA, and 10 saves.

Second stint with the Brewers (2014–2015)
On February 7, 2014, Rodríguez signed a one-year deal to return to the Milwaukee Brewers. Rodriguez was named the Brewers closer to start the 2014 season. On July 6, Rodriguez was selected as an All Star for the 5th time in his career, and the first time since 2009. On August 28, Rodriguez recorded his 1,000th career strikeout in a game against the San Diego Padres, becoming the ninth player among the Top 20 career saves leaders to also record at least 1,000 strikeouts. Rodriguez finished his 2014 campaign posting a 5–5 record with a 3.04 ERA, 73 strikeouts, and converting 44 saves in 49 opportunities. During the season, he rose to tenth place on the all-time saves list.

On February 27, 2015, the Brewers re-signed Rodriguez a two-year, $13 million deal. Milwaukee also held a club option for the 2017 season.  Rodriguez would be paid $3.5 million in 2015 and $5.5 million in 2016. The deal also included a $2 million deferral and a $2 million buyout on the Brewers' 2017 club option worth $6 million. On July 6, Rodríguez was selected as an All Star for a second consecutive season and for the 6th time in his career. During the season, Rodríguez moved up three places on the all-time MLB saves list. On June 8, Rodríguez recorded his 359th career save, moving him past Troy Percival and into ninth place on the all-time list. On July 17, he recorded his 368th career save, passing Jeff Reardon for eighth place on the list. On August 19, Rodríguez recorded save number 378, passing Joe Nathan for seventh place on the all-time list, while also making him the major leagues' active career saves leader.

On September 27, Rodríguez finished his 600th career game, becoming only the 17th pitcher all time to finish 600 games. He finished the season with a 1-3 record and a 2.21 ERA. He made 55 relief appearances and had 38 saves in 40 save chances.

Detroit Tigers (2016–2017)
On November 18, 2015, Rodríguez was traded to the Detroit Tigers in exchange for Javier Betancourt and Manny Piña. During the 2015–16 offseason, Rodríguez contracted the Zika virus while in his native Venezuela. He said it took two months before he "ultimately felt like himself again" and he still felt lingering effects in spring training.

On May 24, Rodríguez recorded his 400th career save, becoming just the sixth pitcher in Major League Baseball history to reach the milestone.

On August 29, Rodríguez recorded his 423rd career save, passing Billy Wagner for fifth all-time in saves. On September 5, Rodríguez recorded his 425th career save, passing John Franco for fourth place on the all-time saves list.

Rodríguez appeared in 61 games for the 2016 Tigers, posting a 3.24 ERA with 44 saves in 49 save chances. The season saves total is the second most for a Tiger pitcher in franchise history, trailing only the 49 saves recorded by José Valverde in 2011. For the first time in his career, Rodríguez had fewer strikeouts (52) than innings pitched.

Following the 2016 season, the Tigers exercised the $6 million club option to bring back Rodríguez for the 2017 season.

Rodríguez began the season as the Tigers closer. On May 9, 2017, manager Brad Ausmus announced that Rodríguez was being demoted from his closer role after blowing his fourth save of the young season, which included blown saves in back-to-back games on May 6 and 7. Justin Wilson replaced Rodríguez as the team's closer. After being demoted from the closer role, Rodríguez continued to struggle, allowing seven runs in  innings, including two home runs. The Tigers released Rodríguez on June 23. During the season he registered a 2–5 record with a 7.82 ERA, and 1.658 WHIP, while allowing nine home runs in  innings.

Washington Nationals
On July 5, 2017, Rodríguez signed a minor league deal with the Washington Nationals, and was assigned to the Harrisburg Senators of the Class AA Eastern League. After pitching five innings, he was released by the Nationals on July 14.

Philadelphia Phillies
On January 29, 2018, Rodríguez signed a minor league deal with the Philadelphia Phillies with an invite to spring training. He was released on March 24.

Long Island Ducks
On April 30, 2018, Rodríguez signed with the Long Island Ducks of the independent Atlantic League of Professional Baseball. He became a free agent following the 2018 season.

Acereros de Monclova
On June 11, 2019, Rodríguez signed with the Acereros de Monclova of the Mexican League. He was released on July 13, 2019.

Pitching style
Rodríguez throws four pitches. He progressed through the minor leagues and into the major leagues throwing a hard four-seam fastball that averaged 95 mph in 2007, but the pitch has settled into the 89–92 mph range through the 2016 season. He also throws a two-seam fastball at 88–91 mph. His off-speed pitches are a curveball at 76–79 mph and a changeup at 82–85 mph. He uses his changeup more against left-handed hitters. It has a whiff rate of 48% since 2007, the third-highest among all changeups thrown by relief pitchers.

Rodríguez has been a strikeout pitcher throughout his career, compiling an average of 10.6 strikeouts per 9 innings pitched through the 2016 season.

Personal life
Rodríguez's nickname of "K-Rod" became popular during the 2002 playoffs. It is a play on "A-Rod", the nickname of former third baseman Alex Rodriguez, with "K" representing the common abbreviation for strikeout. Rodríguez is a practitioner of the Santería religion. Rodríguez has competed in the 2006 and 2009 World Baseball Classic for the Venezuelan team with his former teammate Johan Santana. Rodriguez has 9 children.

Incidents
On June 13, 2009, New York Yankees reliever Brian Bruney criticized Rodríguez, calling his antics on the mound "unbelievable" and saying that Rodriguez has "got a tired act", after seeing his reaction to earning a blown save in 2009 against the Yankees where teammate Luis Castillo dropped a pop-up with two outs in the ninth inning allowing the Yankees to score the winning run. Rodríguez responded by saying "somebody like that, it doesn't bother me", and suggesting that Bruney "better keep his mouth shut and do his job, not worry about somebody else. I don't even know who the guy is. I'm not going to waste my time with that guy. Instead of sending messages through the paper, next time when you see me at Citi Field, come up to me and say it to my face." During batting practice the following day Rodríguez confronted Bruney on the field, pointing and shouting at him before teammates from both sides separated the two.

In May 2010, Rodríguez and bullpen coach Randy Niemann got into a heated exchange while the pitcher was preparing to enter a game. Mets manager Jerry Manuel later said the matter was resolved, without saying what caused the dispute.

On August 11, 2010, Rodríguez was arrested after allegedly assaulting Carlos Peña, the father of his girlfriend Daian Pena after the Mets lost a game at Citi Field. Rodríguez was reportedly upset that he made disparaging remarks about Rodríguez's mother. Rodríguez remained in police custody at Citi Field on a charge of third-degree assault, a misdemeanor in the state of New York, and was arraigned that afternoon. He was released without bail, and ordered by a judge to stay away from his girlfriend and her father. The Mets suspended him and placed him on the team's restricted list for two days, which meant he would forfeit two games' salary. "Ownership and the organization are very disappointed in Francisco's inappropriate behavior and we take the matter very seriously", team chief operating officer Jeff Wilpon said. Rodríguez suffered a torn ligament in his right thumb, possibly during the altercation, requiring season-ending surgery. The Mets suspended Rodríguez indefinitely, preventing him from attending or performing any activity with the team, as well as having his pay suspended until he was physically able to perform again. On September 22, 2010, Rodriguez was back in Queens Criminal Court facing seven counts of criminal contempt after sending numerous text messages to Daian Pena in violation of the order of protection. The judge imposed bail of $7,500, which Rodriguez posted.

Rodriguez was charged with domestic violence in Wisconsin relating to a September 17, 2012, incident in which he allegedly hit and kicked the mother of his child. He was facing a fine of $10,000 and/or up to 9 months in prison.  Charges were subsequently dropped against Rodriguez when the victim and the eyewitness (housekeeper) both returned to Venezuela and did not respond to the district attorney on the case.

See also

List of Major League Baseball annual saves leaders
List of Major League Baseball players from Venezuela

References

External links

Francisco Rodríguez at Pura Pelota (Venezuelan Professional Baseball League)

1982 births
Living people
Acereros de Monclova players
American League All-Stars
American League saves champions
Anaheim Angels players
Arkansas Travelers players
Baltimore Orioles players
Boise Hawks players
Brevard County Manatees players
Butte Copper Kings players
Detroit Tigers players
Hagerstown Suns players
Harrisburg Senators players
Lake Elsinore Storm players
Long Island Ducks players
Los Angeles Angels players
Luis Aparicio Award winners
Major League Baseball pitchers
Major League Baseball players from Venezuela
Mexican League baseball pitchers
Milwaukee Brewers players
Nashville Sounds players
National League All-Stars
New York Mets players
Potomac Nationals players
Rancho Cucamonga Quakes players
Salt Lake Stingers players
Baseball players from Caracas
Tiburones de La Guaira players
Venezuelan expatriate baseball players in Mexico
Venezuelan expatriate baseball players in the United States
World Baseball Classic players of Venezuela
2006 World Baseball Classic players
2009 World Baseball Classic players
2013 World Baseball Classic players
2017 World Baseball Classic players